Combate or O Jornal Combate was a Portuguese newspaper published in Lisbon, Portugal. It existed between June 1974 to February 1978.

History and profile
The first edition of Combate appeared on 21 June 1974. The paper had a Marxist stance. Phil Mailer served as the editor of the paper. The first ten issues were published weekly. The remaining issues appeared fortnightly with interruptions until February 1978 when the paper ceased publication.

References

1974 establishments in Portugal
1978 disestablishments in Portugal
Biweekly newspapers
Communist newspapers
Defunct newspapers published in Portugal
Defunct weekly newspapers
Marxist newspapers
Newspapers published in Lisbon
Portuguese-language newspapers
Publications established in 1974
Publications disestablished in 1978